Castelo Branco is an inland city and municipality in Central Portugal. It has 34,455 inhabitants in its urban area (2021) and is the seat of the district of the same name. The municipality, with 52,272 inhabitants, is made up of 19 freguesias (civil parishes) spread through , making it the 3rd largest in Portugal by total land area.

The municipality is bounded in the north by Fundão, in the east by Idanha-a-Nova, in the south by Spain, in the southwest by Vila Velha de Ródão, and in the west by Proença-a-Nova and Oleiros.

History 

Castelo Branco gets its name from the prior existence of a Luso-Roman castrum or fortified settlement called Castra Leuca, on the summit of the hill of Colina da Cardosa.  The population grew on the slopes of this hill.

Little is known of the history before 1182.  There is, nevertheless, a document, from this date, mentioning the donation to the Templars of a piece of land called Vila Franca da Cardosa, by a noble Fernandes Sanches.   In 1213 it received its autonomy or foral and the name Castel-Branco appears for the first time. Pope Innocent III confirmed this in 1215 giving it the name of Castelo Branco.

It was around this time that the Templar Knights built the walls and the castle.

In 1510 a new foral was conceded by Manuel I and in 1642 the town acquired the status of Vila de Castelo Branco.

In 1771 Castelo Branco became a city and a bishopric (see below) until 1881.

In 1858 a telegraph line was opened between  Abrantes and  Castelo Branco and in 1860 the city received its first public lighting.
 
In 1959 it became capital of the district of the same name.

Ecclesiastical History 
Pope Clement XIV created the diocese of Castelo Branco on 1771.06.07.

On 1881.09.30 it was suppressed and its territory merged into the then Diocese of Portalegre, which adopted its title, becoming the present Diocese of Portalegre-Castelo Branco, and made the former Cathedral of Castelo Branco, dedicated to St. Michael the Archangel, its Co-cathedral.

It has had the following residential Bishops :
 José de Jesus Maria Caetano, Dominican Order (O.P.) (1771 – death 1782.07.13)
 Vicente Ferreira da Rocha, O.P. (1782.12.16 – death 1814.08.25)
 Bishop-elect Patrício da Silva, Augustinian Order (O.E.S.A.) (1818 – 1819.05.03), later Metropolitan Archbishop of Évora (Portugal) ([1819.05.03] 1820.02.21 – 1826.03.13), created Cardinal-Priest with no Title assigned (1824.09.27 – 1840.01.03), promoted Patriarch of Lisboa (Portugal) (1826.03.13 – death 1840.01.03)
 Joaquim José de Miranda Coutinho (1819.05.03 – death 1831.04.06)
 Guilherme Henriques de Carvalho (1846 – death  1857.11.15), also Apostolic Administrator of Portalegre (Portugal) (1846 – 1857.11.15), created Cardinal-Priest of S. Maria sopra Minerva (1854.11.30 – 1857.11.15); previously Bishop of Leiria (Portugal) ([1840] 1843.04.03 – 1845.11.24), Patriarch of Lisboa (Portugal) (1845.11.24 – 1857.11.15)
 ?vacancy.

Places of interest 
The most important monument in Castelo Branco is the Jardim do Paço Episcopal (Garden of the Episcopal Palace). It is one of the most beautiful Baroque gardens in Portugal and contains statues of allegories, kings and zodiacal signs, arranged around ponds, terraces and staircases.

Civil Parishes 
Administratively, the municipality is divided into 19 civil parishes (freguesias):

 Alcains
 Almaceda
 Benquerenças
 
 Cebolais de Cima e Retaxo
 
 
 Freixial do Campo e Juncal do Campo
 Lardosa
 Louriçal do Campo
 Malpica do Tejo
 Monforte da Beira
 Ninho do Açor e Sobral do Campo
 Póvoa de Rio de Moinhos e Cafede
 Salgueiro do Campo
 Santo André das Tojeiras
 São Vicente da Beira
 Sarzedas
 Tinalhas

Climate 

Castelo Branco has a hot-summer mediterranean climate. Its summers are among the hottest of Portugal, influenced by its inland position. Winters are mild with cool nights, but frosts are rare and never severe. Inland areas further south in the country have hotter temperature extremes, although averages are very similar. There is somewhat of a seasonal lag in summer since September is significantly warmer than May in spite of less daylight. Winter temperatures are more consistent with the daylight cycle, since temperatures drop sharply in autumn months.

Economy 
The city is home to Centauro, a company which produces industrial coolers, refrigerators and freezers. The Portuguese subsidiary of Danone has a factory in Castelo Branco which produces Danone's dairy products for the entire Iberian Peninsula. The district of Castelo Branco is also famed for the Castelo Branco cheese.

Delphi Packard is a major factory and the principal employer, with more than 1000 workers.  The Factory makes automobile component for the most important automobile constructors like Ferrari.

Shopping malls in Castelo Branco (Alegro and Fórum)

Education 
Castelo Branco is home to the Instituto Politécnico de Castelo Branco, a state-run polytechnic institute of higher education, comprising schools of agriculture, technology, management, education, art and health.

Transportation 
Railways:
Castelo Branco is the principal station located some  up the Beira Baixa Railway Line from Entroncamento to Guarda.  It runs via Abrantes, Rodão, Castelo Branco and Fundão with services currently terminating at Covilhã some  short of Guarda. Rail services are operated by CP - Comboios de Portugal (Portuguese Trains) and consist of three stopping trains (Regionais) and three fast trains (Intercidades) per day from Lisbon via Entroncamento. The fast trains take less than 3hours to reach Castelo Branco from Lisbon Santa Apolonia and Lisbon Oriente main stations.  Stopping trains are considerably slower.

From Entroncamento, the route branches off the Lisbon to Porto main line onto the Beira Baixa line following the mighty Tagus river crossing it twice on impressively long bridges. From Abrantes a series of reservoirs come into view. For lengthy stretches the single track clings to the NW flanks of the reservoirs providing exhilarating forested views as you speed along the waterside.  The services are operated by comfortable and purposeful 'Iberian Gauge' (5ft6in) 25 kV electric multiple units. After passing through some deep gorges into Rodao station the line then heads north away from the river and on to Castelo Branco and finally Covilhã.

From Covilhã northwards to Guarda trains were operated by more leisurely diesel motorcars.  This scenic stretch of mountainous rural line provides the strategic last leg of the Beira Baixa Railway linking it to Guarda via Belmonte. However, in recent years it has been closed for modernisation and electrification. The partially completed works, originally due for completion in 2011, are sadly still on hold  due to serious funding issues associated with the economy. This inconveniently cuts off otherwise direct rail options from Castelo Branco to destinations north of Covilhã.

Notable people 

Amatus Lusitanus (1511–1568) a physician, an early discoverer of the circulation of the blood
Francisco Caldeira Castelo Branco (1566–1619) a Captain-major, founded Belém, capital of Pará in Brazil in 1616.
Elijah Montalto (1567-1616) Jewish physician at the French royal court, author of works on vision and brain diseases 
Manuel Dias the Younger (1574–1659) a Jesuit missionary to China where he introduced the telescope
José Ramos Preto (1871–1949) a Portuguese jurist and politician, held high office in 1920
José Hipólito Raposo (1885–1953) politician, writer, lawyer and historian; co-founded Integralismo Lusitano
Dr. José Lopes Dias (1900-1976) physician, writer, historian and philanthropist, founder of ESALD and Jardim de Infâcia Alfredo da Mota.
Eugénia Lima, (Wiki PT) (1926—2014) a famous Portuguese accordionist
António Baltasar Marcelino (1930–2013) Bishop of the Roman Catholic Diocese of Aveiro.
Maria Adelaide Aboim Inglez (1932–2008) a PCP activist who opposed the Estado Novo regime
António Ramalho Eanes (born in Alcains 1935) general and politician, 16th President of Portugal, 1976-1986.
João Filipe Fazendas Vaz (born ca.1960) sports journalist well known in Spain for his analysis and knowledge of football Lusophone.
Norton (formed 2002) and indie, pop, alternative rock band

Sport 
Nuno Rolão (born 1976) a retired footballer with 459 club caps
Ana Hormigo (born 1981) an extra-lightweight judoka, competed at the 2008 Summer Olympics
Dani Matos (born 1983) a footballer with over 300 club caps.
João Afonso (born 1990) a footballer with over 320 club caps

See also 
 List of Catholic dioceses in Portugal

References

Sources and external links

 Municipality official website
 GCatholic - bishopric
 Photos from Castelo Branco
 The Barrocal Park (Granite Massif, aged 310 ± 1 million years) 
 Statistical Information about the Municipality
 Instituto Politécnico de Castelo Branco
 Hospital Amato Lusitano

 
Cities in Portugal
Populated places in Castelo Branco District
Municipalities of Castelo Branco District